Philometra cyanopodi is a species of parasitic nematode of fishes, first found off New Caledonia in the South Pacific, in the gonads of Epinephelus cyanopodus. This species is characterized mainly by: length of spicules and length and structure of its gubernaculum; structure of male caudal end; body size; location in host and types of hosts.

References

Further reading
Moravec, František, Rosa A. Chávez, and Marcelo E. Oliva. "A new gonad-infecting species of Philometra (Nematoda: Philometridae) from the red cusk-eel Genypterus chilensis (Osteichthyes: Ophidiidae) off Chile."Parasitology research 108.1 (2011): 227-232.
Moravec, F., E. J. Fajer-Avila, and M. Bakenhaster. "Philometra floridensis sp. n.(Nematoda: Philometridae) from the ovary of red drum Sciaenops ocellatus (Osteichthyes: Sciaenidae) off the coast of Florida, USA." Journal of Helminthology 84.01 (2010): 49-54.

Camallanida
Parasitic nematodes of fish
Nematodes described in  2008